Cei Llydan is an intermediate railway station on the Llanberis Lake Railway (LLR), located in Llanberis, Gwynedd, Wales.

Most of the LLR was laid around 1970 on part of the trackbed of the closed and lifted Padarn Railway. For thirty years  was the new line's southern terminus, situated a short distance south of the site of the Padarn Railway's former workmen's station, also named Gilfach Ddu. In 2003 a wholly new extension was opened south westwards, with  station as the line's new southern terminus. With this extension Gilfach Ddu (LLR) changed from a terminus to a through station.

The line and station primarily serve tourists and railway enthusiasts, with Cei Llydan recommended for picnics and viewing the scenery.

The station has one platform.

References

Sources

External links

 The station and line in Llanberis Lake Railway
 Edwardian 6" map showing the future station site, overlain with modern satellite images and maps in National Library of Scotland
 The station and line in Rail Map Online
 Images of the station and line in Yahoo

Railway stations in Great Britain opened in 1971
Llanberis
Heritage railway stations in Gwynedd
Railway stations built for UK heritage railways